Vici Gaming (VG) is a Chinese professional esports organization based in Shanghai. It has teams competing in Dota 2, League of Legends, StarCraft II, WarCraft III, FIFA, Hearthstone and Counter-Strike: Global Offensive. Vici Gaming's Dota 2 team has been a top contender in numerous tournaments, most notably as runners-up of The International 2014.

Dota 2

History

2012 
Vici Gaming was founded on 21 September 2012 with the help of "Fengdidi", who previously played in PanDarea Gaming under the name PanPan, handpicking skilled players that were highly ranked on the Chinese DotA ladder at the time.

The players had no previous professional experience at the time with the exception of sydm who had played under the banner of TyLoo. Their mid lane player Cty had shown promise by winning a 1v1 tournament organized by 2009, in which he beat famous players like Ferrari_430, Sylar, Hao, and other top Chinese players shortly before getting recruited.

The team qualified for the 2012 G-League Season 2 by beating Noah's Ark in the preliminaries.

2013 
On 28 January, Vici signed Greedy, captained by the famous YaphetS as their online/backup squad. The rest of the team consisted of xiaotuji, Maybe, nL_Ks, and CaptainGiveMeBall. They were focused on Dota, although they have since expanded to Dota 2.

On 1 March, Vici signed ZSMJ, the founder of Dota 2 squad.  It was believed that ZSMJ brought some of his teammates from his project with Chisbug to Vici Gaming, of which a member is Sgua_Li.  In the following weeks, Vici Gaming made some roster adjustments, dropping some players in private while sending out a public notice for interested players to contact them.

On 28 March, it was announced that carry player ZSMJ replaced mid player sydm and that former carry Cty picked up the mid role.

In June 2013, following elimination from The International 2013 qualifiers and a disappointing finish outside playoff places in DSL, Vici Gaming announced the departure of team executive, PandaPanPan, and team manager, Nada. Their replacement was mikasa, who had played as a substitute for VG.

On 31 October, Sylar joined the team as the new carry player, but would not be in the starting lineup for almost two months due to contract terms and TuTu remains to play on the ongoing 2013 WPC Ace Dota 2 League.

In December 2013, Vici Gaming traveled to Poland to compete in the Raidcall EMS Fall LAN finals, joining the ranks of teams like Alliance, Natus Vincere, and DK who were pioneers in east-west tournament participation. Vici would go on to take first place at EMS One Fall. Following this, the team also traveled to the Kingston HyperX Dota 2 League in Las Vegas., but would subsequently fall from the top of Dota 2 due to a lack of direction and poor player performances. Despite placing at many events Vici would not achieve another title in the TI3 to TI4 season.

2014 
On 16 April, it was announced that former EHOME player QQQ will be joining VG as a coach.

At the end of April 2014, Vici Gaming received an invitation to The International 2014, where they would go on to place first in the group stage and second overall. They lost to NewBee in the finals 3–1.

On 17 August, rOtK announced his retirement. 26 August  Sylar leaves the team, and Black^ and  join. VG looked very strong with their new lineup for the rest of the year, certainly the best Chinese team.

In mid December they travelled to Los Angeles to compete in The Summit 2 and as strong favorites they defeated Cloud9 for the Championship 3–1.

2015 
VG had a strong 2015 season. In February, they reached the finals of Dota 2 Asian Championships ("the biggest event outside of The International") with not too much effort, but they lost shockingly 0–3 to Evil Geniuses in the Grand Finals, especially since they defeated them 20 the day before. With the next International being months away, this definitely shook up things for VG and they must've started analyzing their future and possibilities.

On 11 March, Hao joined VG, replacing Black^ in the Carry position, after a month of speculation and rumors going on.

On 15 March, the team announced the creation of a youth squad, VG.P. On 27 April, Vici won Starladder XII after defeating Invictus Gaming 3–1.
They were one of the officially invited teams for The International 2015 with a complete prize pool of $18,377,817 and on 2 July they confirmed that they've obtained their USA visas, needed to participate in the event. They ended losing to LGD Gaming to finish 4th and securing $1,562,114.
During the first day of The International 2015, VG became the first team outside of Europe to obtain the Verified Tag on Facebook, and third after only Fnatic and Gambit Gaming. After the annual post-TI break/shuffle period, Hao returned to Newbee and VG acquired Xu "BurNIng" Zhilei and Yang "YJ" Pu. They finished 2nd in the Nanyang Championships, falling 2–3 to Secret in the Grand Finals. They would proceed to participate in the first ever Major by Valve in Frankfurt, Germany. They finished in 5th place with $205,000 in winnings.

Roster

VGJ 
In September 2016, Vici Gaming signed an agreement with American basketball player Jeremy Lin and investment group China Digital Group to form another Dota 2 team, called VGJ, meant to create a celebrity brand in esports. The team later split into two branches in 2017: VGJ.Thunder, based in China, and VGJ.Storm, based in North America. In May 2018, VGJ.Storm won the GESC Thailand Dota 2 Minor tournament, while VGJ.Thunder qualified for The International 2018 with a top eight finish in the Dota Pro Circuit, with VGJ.Storm winning in the North American regional qualifiers to also gain an invite. In September 2018, the VGJ organization announced an ending to the Vici Gaming partnership due to new Dota Pro Circuit team ownership rules. As a result, it disbanded VGJ.Thunder and rebranded VGJ.Storm as J.Storm, with the team focusing on the North American esports scene.

League of Legends

History 

On 1 December 2015, VG signed former SKT T1 mid laner Lee "Easyhoon" Ji-hoon to their roster.

On 2 January 2021, VG rebranded as Rare Atom.

Final roster

Other rosters

Counter-Strike: Global Offensive

Hearthstone 
 Minyang "Ant" Wong
 Anping "Season" Tan
 Jingfan "ChinaYLD" Zhu
 Yan "Rosicky" Zhongshu

FIFA 
 Zheng "Zola" Yang

References

External links 
 

 
2012 establishments in China
Companies based in Shanghai
Dota teams
Hearthstone teams
Esports teams based in China
FIFA (video game series) teams
League of Legends Pro League teams
Esports teams established in 2012
Sports teams in Shanghai